Jonathan Clinkscale (born November 17, 1982) is a former American football right guard.  He played college football at University of Wisconsin. He went undrafted and played professionally for the Tampa Bay Buccaneers and the Cincinnati Bengals of the National Football League (NFL).

Early years
Clinkscale in Altadena, California, to mother Brenda Jackson, who worked at the Jet Propulsion Laboratory at California Institute of Technology (Caltech) and raised the family as a single mother. Brown's parents divorced when she was young. He has a fraternal twin sister named Aja Brown, who was mayor of Compton, California.

Professional career

Tampa Bay Buccaneers
Clinkscale was signed by the Tampa Bay Buccaneers after going undrafted in the 2005 NFL Draft.

Cincinnati Bengals

Rhein Fire
Clinkscale signed with Rhein Fire of the National Football League Europa in 2007.

Orlando Predators
Clinkscale signed with the Orlando Predators of the Arena Football League in 2008.

Personal life
Clinkscale currently resides in Madison, Wisconsin and works for the Madison Fire Department.

References

Living people
1982 births
Wisconsin Badgers football players
American football offensive guards
Tampa Bay Buccaneers players
Cincinnati Bengals players
Rhein Fire players
Orlando Predators players
Players of American football from California
People from Altadena, California
American twins
American firefighters